MERA FM 107.4, formerly known as Samaa FM, is a radio station in Pakistan, covering Karachi, Lahore, Islamabad, Peshawar, Sialkot and Bahawalpur with its transmission.

History 
Launched in 2012 as Samaa FM, the radio station is owned by Project Implementation Managers Private Limited. Previously, it was known as FM104.

In November 2021, the station rebranded itself from Samaa FM to MERA FM.

Shows 

 The Sunrise Show - Adeel Azhar – 07:00 AM – 09:00 AM

 Coffee Mornings - Sulmeen Ansari – 09:00 AM – 11:00 AM

 Talk of the Town – Ambreen Hala (Karachi) – 11:00 AM – 01:00 PM

 Talk of the Town – Aisha Malik (Lahore) – 11:00 AM – 01:00 PM

 Showbiz Showbiz Superstars – Shahpara Salim – 01:00 PM – 03:00 PM

 Lagao – Sahar Aman – 05:00 PM – 08:00 PM

 It's My Show – Sahir Lodhi – 10:00 PM – 12:00 AM

 Club @ 8 – Imran Hassan – 8:00 PM – 10:00 AM

 Slow Jamz – Sana Humayun – 12:00 AM – 02:00 AM

 Chill Karo – Sara Baloch – 05:00 PM – 08:00 PM

 Sunday Morning Show – Dr. Ajaz Qureshi – 09:00 AM – 11:00 AM

 ‘3G’ Gullu Gulzar & Gulzari – Azhar Ali – 11:00 AM – 01:00 PM

Awards 
At the 4th Pakistan Media Awards, two of the station's RJs Adeel Azhar and Sulmeen Ansari bagged the Best Male and Female RJ Awards, respectively.

As per research and analysis by GroupM Pakistan, RJ Sahir Lodhi was the people's choice as the Favorite RJ. A study by Radio Score MERA FM as Pakistan's No.1 radio station for RJ-based category.

Another research by Media Miles revealed MERA FM 107.4 as the top most advertised station with 18% share of minutes advertised in Karachi, Lahore and Islamabad.

References

External links 
 Official site: MERAFM

Radio stations in Pakistan
2012 establishments in Pakistan